Raimondo Montecuccoli (P432) is the third ship of Paolo Thaon di Revel-class offshore patrol vessel.

Development and design 
Italian Navy ordered the new MBDA TESEO MK/2E heavy-duty missile (TESEO "EVO"), a long-range anti-ship missilewith also strategic land attack capability. The missile will have a new terminal "head" with dual RF seeker (Radio Frequency) and, presumably, date the need to even attack ground targets, IIR (Imaging IR). Compared to the predecessor OTOMAT/TESEO, the TESEO "EVO" MK/2E has a double range or more than 360 km. Former OTOMAT is accredited for a range of action of more than 180 km.

Construction and career
Raimondo Montecuccoli was laid down on 8 November 2018 at Fincantieri Muggiano and was launched on 13 March 2021. Expected to be commissioned in January 2023.

References

External links
 Pattugliatori Polivalenti di Altura Marina Militare website

2021 ships
Ships built by Fincantieri